From Broadway with Love is a 1966 studio album by singer Nancy Wilson arranged by Sid Feller and produced by Dave Cavanaugh.

Reception

The initial Billboard magazine review from January 22, 1966 commented that "this new set has a strong representation of topflight show song material and she sings them with unusual precision".

Jason Ankeny reviewed the album for Allmusic and wrote that the album "...bends the material to the singer's strengths, eschewing show tune dramatics in favor of subtle, atmospheric arrangements...". Ankeny highlighted "He Loves Me" and "Here's That Rainy Day" as "play[ing] perfectly to the singer's remarkable capacity to articulate the exhilaration and heartache of romance".

Track listing 
 "Hey There" (Richard Adler, Jerry Ross) – 2:23
 "This Dream" (Leslie Bricusse, Anthony Newley) – 2:00
 "I'll Only Miss Him When I Think of Him" (Sammy Cahn, Jimmy Van Heusen) – 2:46
 "He Loves Me" (Jerry Bock, Sheldon Harnick) – 2:27
 "Here's That Rainy Day" (Van Heusen) – 2:28
 "I Had a Ball" (Jack Lawrence, Stan Freeman) – 2:02
 "Hello, Dolly!" (Jerry Herman) – 2:24
 "Makin' Whoopee" (Walter Donaldson, Gus Kahn) – 2:20
 "Somewhere" (Leonard Bernstein, Stephen Sondheim) – 2:26
 "I've Got Your Number" (Cy Coleman, Carolyn Leigh) – 2:17
 "Young and Foolish" (Albert Hague) – 2:50
 "You'd Better Love Me" (Timothy Gray, Hugh Martin) – 2:14

Personnel 
 Nancy Wilson - vocals
 Sid Feller – arranger, conductor
 Dave Cavanaugh - producer

References

1966 albums
Nancy Wilson (jazz singer) albums
Albums arranged by Sid Feller
Albums conducted by Sid Feller
Albums produced by Dave Cavanaugh
Capitol Records albums